Doomsday is a novel by Warwick Deeping which was published in 1927.
 
Set in post-1918, rural Sussex, the story revolves around a girl with aspirations to leave her small town, as well as her relationship with a man living on a local acreage, known as the Doomsday Farm.

Released after his big seller Sorrell and Son, Doomsday was also successful, and became the third-best selling book in the United States for 1927.

The novel was developed into a movie of the same name released in 1928 and which starred Florence Vidor and Gary Cooper.

External links
 Full text of Doomsday at HathiTrust Digital Library

1927 British novels
British novels adapted into films
British romance novels
Cassell (publisher) books
Fiction set in 1918
Novels set in Sussex
Novels by Warwick Deeping
Contemporary romance novels